LaQuan Nairn (born 31 July 1996) is a male long jumper from Nassau, Bahamas. He attended C.R Walker High school in Nassau, Bahamas before going on to compete for South Plains College, and University of Arkansas. Nairn broke the Long jump indoor national record at the 2022 Tyson Invitational, with a jump of 8.18 meters.

Nairn is the younger brother of Lourawls Nairn Jr. who played basketball for the Michigan State Spartans.

Personal bests

References

External links
 World Athletics
 Razorbacks Bio
 LaQuan Nairn talks About Faith, His Character, and Going Pro EP #8 #BeyondTheBall

1996 births
Living people
Sportspeople from Nassau, Bahamas
Bahamian male long jumpers
Bahamian male triple jumpers
Bahamian male high jumpers
Arkansas Razorbacks men's track and field athletes
University of Arkansas alumni
South Plains College alumni
Junior college men's track and field athletes in the United States
Athletes (track and field) at the 2022 Commonwealth Games
Commonwealth Games gold medallists for the Bahamas
Commonwealth Games medallists in athletics
Medallists at the 2022 Commonwealth Games